Stranger Among Bears is a 2009 television documentary series about the retired school teacher Charlie Vandergaw, a self-taught animal behaviourist, who has lived in Alaska for over 20 years. Although against the law of the State of Alaska, the repeated and regular feeding of grizzlies and black bears over many years enabled Vandergaw to habituate these animals to him, thus allowing him to studying their patterns of behaviour.
In 2010, Mr. Vandergaw pleaded guilty to the aforementioned violation of the law, and was given a 180-days suspended jail sentence, plus a $20,000 fine. Nonetheless, Mr. Vandergaw is considered, even by some State wildlife officials, likely to be the State's leading authority on interpreting bear behaviour.

The documentary was aired on the cable TV channel Animal Planet.

Contents
The series introduce Mr. Vandergaw's perspective on bears, and an unorthodox approach to interacting with them. Although not his initial intent upon moving into the cabin located in Alaska, Mr. Vandergaw tried to create an environment where humans could coexist with bears peacefully. Thus, his goal was to further the understanding of these carnivorous animals by means of exploring new paths of communication between humans and them. Instead of trying to tame them, Mr. Vandergaw aimed at befriending them on their own terms, and on his territory. Admittingly, this would have been impossible without the use of food that is given to the animals, since these apparently insatiable animals show more interest in food than in anything else. In the show, bears reveal their playful yet highly destructive nature, so that even cubs are evidently powerful enough to cause destruction in relatively short amounts of time. In addition, it is evident that the bears must have bonded with Vandergaw, given he can rest with the animals; thus, these bears appear to being able to trust him, and vice versa. The show also portrays Mr. Vandergaw's struggle with the authorities which are taking more a traditional approach to handling the coexistence between human settlers and bears. Eventually, Mr. Vandergaw is defeated by the State of Alaska.

The bears visiting Bear Haven
In the first episode, mostly black bears are shown, and when hunters visit Charlie's property, they only interact with black bears. These bears are more docile than their larger cousins, the grizzlies. Grizzlies are apex predators and more aggressive, while black bears may see a fully-grown man as more their physical equal. Charlie Vandergaw loves his black bears, but he becomes particularly excited when the grizzlies begin showing up. When they do, however, the seemingly idyllic Bear Haven becomes a very different place. Even among black bears, the seemingly peaceful coexistence is just a dream, as adult males will occasionally attempt to kill cubs, which the mother will defend. The relationship between black bears and grizzlies is strained at best. Grizzlies do not tolerate the presence of black bears well, often confronting and intimidating the smaller bears. Without someone feeding these animals, they would never tolerate each other's close presence. Also, befriending a hungry bear has potentially tragic consequences. One of Charlie's favorite bears is a young female grizzly named Misty, and appears not long after her brother, Tank. Cookie, a fully adult grizzly matriarch, has the most powerful presence and is possibly the most dangerous bear at Bear Haven. Eric, an adult male black bear, is the most sociable, and he is even invited in the house at times. Charlie is quite fond of him.

Interaction with bears
Aside from feeding the bears often from his own hand, Vandergaw is very physical with some of them. Petting them like dogs, touching them, talking to them, using his considerable understanding of the animals behaviour to keep him safe. He can tell the bears visiting Bear Haven apart and know them all by names he gave them over the years. Throughout the series Charlie shows great respect for the bears physical might and refrains from startling them or setting them off in other ways. When a bear is upset with him he shows little concern and makes no threatening or fleeing gestures.
Throughout the series Charlie is shown hitting the bears from time to time, usually when a bear gets out of line, which is a very dangerous situation that can escalate into a mauling in a heartbeat. The quote "NO BITING! NO BITING!" and other verbal reprimands are repeated a lot. Some bears appear to be extremely ill-mannered and will not miss a chance to bite an unsuspecting human, but they seem to respect the heavy-handed approach and especially the stick. They are obviously unhurt by the beating and appear to handle it like normal social interaction and a fair warning. The old man often slaps the younger grizzlies or black bears with his hand and uses a stick when he has to settle an older much more dangerous grizzly.

Controversy
It is believed that bears possess a natural fear of humans, thus avoiding them whenever possible. However, the familiarisation of bears with humans is believed to remove a bears' natural reluctance to approaching humans, resulting in potentially dangerous and fatal encounters.

Habituation is a tool for allowing humans to spend time among bears, but when cameraman Richard Terry spent time at Vandergaw's self-proclaimed bear sanctuary to film, he mindlessly ascended the same tree occupied by a yearling bear cub that luckily only resulted in mild lacerations on his right ankle and foot. Over the years that Vandergaw had been feeding the bears, he also sustained several bite wounds. Vandergaw, a former hunter, confesses he used to hunt bears. In the show, Vandergaw would touch, pet, and even film the bears in a manner similar to the eco-warrior, Timothy Treadwell, who was eventually killed and devoured by grizzlies. However, and contrary to Treadwell, Vandergaw appears to be well aware of the predatory nature of bears.

In the documentary's conclusion, Vandergaw was charged and convicted of illegally feeding bears. He received a $20,000 fine and a suspended sentence. He placed an electric fence around his property to keep the bears away from the cabin located on Bear Haven grounds.

Each episode opened with the following disclaimer:  The following program contains scenes of a man feeding wild bears. Such activity is dangerous and illegal.

References

External links
 Stranger Among Bears at Discovery.com

2009 American television series debuts
2009 American television series endings
2000s American documentary television series
Documentaries about animals
Television series about bears
Animal Planet original programming